The following is a list of awards and nominations received by the television series M*A*S*H.

Golden Globe Awards

Primetime Emmy Awards

M*A*S*H
M*A*S*H